Milan Božić (born January 23, 1982, in Toronto, Ontario) is a Canadian football player of Serbian origin.

Božić previously played with Serbian top league clubs FK Zvezdara and FK Hajduk Beograd, Ukrainian club FC Volyn Lutsk, lower league Serbian clubs FK Inđija, FK Železničar Beograd and FK Kolubara and with the Bosnian Premier League club FK Leotar.

During the 2009–10 season, Božić played with FK Beograd in the Serbian League Belgrade. In 2012–13, he played with FK Bulbulderac, which restored its former name, FK Zvezdara in summer 2013.

References

Living people
1982 births
Soccer players from Toronto
Canadian people of Serbian descent
Canadian soccer players
Canadian expatriate soccer players
FK Zvezdara players
FK Hajduk Beograd players
FK Železničar Beograd players
FK Inđija players
FK Kolubara players
FK Beograd players
Canadian expatriate sportspeople in Serbia
FC Volyn Lutsk players
Expatriate footballers in Ukraine
FK Leotar players
Ukrainian Premier League players
Canadian expatriate sportspeople in Ukraine
Expatriate footballers in Bosnia and Herzegovina
Association football midfielders
Canadian expatriate sportspeople in Bosnia and Herzegovina